Theophilus I of Jerusalem was the patriarch of the Church of Jerusalem from 1012 to 1020. 

Theophilus was Bishop of Hibal before his appointment as Patriarch of Jerusalem by Mufarrij ibn Daghfal ibn al-Jarrah, the autonomous ruler of Palestine. The appointment occurred under the rule of Fatimid Caliph al-Hakim. Mufarrij suggested that the Christian community should re-build the Church of the Holy Sepulchre. However, shortly after making the suggestion, al-Hakim, who, earlier, had ordered the previous church destroyed, declared war on Mufarrij, and sent his troops to Syria and Palestine. Mufarrij soon died and his son and Patriarch Theophilus fled into hiding. In 1013, after a new amicable governor was seated, Patriarch Theophilus returned and stayed in Jerusalem until his repose in 1020.

References

Source
 Who is who in the Churches of Jerusalem

11th-century patriarchs of Jerusalem
Melkites in the Fatimid Caliphate
1020 deaths